Cleistocactus morawetzianus is a species of columnar cactus in the genus Cleistocactus,  endemic to Peru.

Synonyms
 Cleistocactus villaazulensis F.Ritter

References

 Jahrb. Deutsch. Kakteen-Ges. 1: 77 1936.
 The Plant List entry
 Encyclopedia of Life entry
 IUCN Redlist entry

 

Trichocereeae
Cacti of South America
Endemic flora of Peru